Cecil Mannering (28 December 1886 – 1974) was a Scottish film actor.

Selected filmography
 Kissing Cup (1913)
 The Heart of Midlothian (1914)
 Beau Brocade (1916)
 The Valley of Fear (1916)
 The Grit of a Jew (1917)
 The Duchess of Seven Dials (1920)
 In Full Cry (1921)
 What the Butler Saw (1924)
 Storm in a Teacup (1937)
 Merry Comes to Town (1937)

References

External links

Year of birth unknown
Year of death unknown
Scottish male film actors
Scottish male silent film actors
Male actors from Edinburgh
20th-century Scottish male actors
1886 births